The Circo de los Altares is a geological formation of the Patagonian Andes, located in the Southern Patagonian Ice Field, where Mount Torre and Mount Fitz Roy can be seen from its western sides. It is located within the Area in dispute between Chile and Argentina with the border being defined in the northern area of the site.

It is located within the Bernardo O'Higgins National Park in the Magallanes and Chilean Antarctica Region and in the Argentine part (in dispute) in the Los Glaciares National Park in the Santa Cruz Province.

The tours to the site are made from the Argentine town of El Chaltén, passing through the Paso Marconi until reaching the site. Tours are also offered from the Chilean town of Villa O'Higgins.

To the east of the Torre Mountain Range the Chaltén Mountain Range Natural Site, which is also part of the Bernardo O'Higgins National Park, can be found. 

In 2021 there was a controversy since CONAF (from Chile) installed a dome in the place which its southern part is claimed by both countries.

References 

Tourist attractions in Chile
Landforms of Magallanes Region
Geology of Santa Cruz Province, Argentina
Disputed territories in South America